St Mary's Church, Reculver, was founded in the 7th century as either a minster or a monastery on the site of a Roman fort at Reculver, which was then at the north-eastern extremity of Kent in south-eastern England. In 669, the site of the fort was given for this purpose by King Ecgberht of Kent to a priest named Bassa, beginning a connection with Kentish kings that led to King Eadberht II of Kent being buried there in the 760s, and the church becoming very wealthy by the beginning of the 9th century. From the early 9th century to the 11th the church was treated as essentially a piece of property, with control passing between kings of Mercia, Wessex and England and the archbishops of Canterbury. Viking attacks may have extinguished the church's religious community in the 9th century, although an early 11th-century record indicates that the church was then in the hands of a dean accompanied by monks. By the time of Domesday Book, completed in 1086, St Mary's was serving as a parish church.

The original building, which incorporated stone and tiles scavenged from the Roman fort, was a simple one consisting only of a nave and an apsidal chancel, with a small room, or porticus, built out from each of the church's northern and southern sides where the nave and chancel met. The church was much altered and expanded during the Middle Ages, including the addition of twin towers in the 12th century; the last addition, in the 15th century, was of north and south porches leading into the nave. This expansion coincided with a long period of prosperity for the settlement of Reculver: the settlement's decline led to the church's decay and, following unsuccessful attempts to prevent the erosion of the adjacent coastline, the building was almost completely demolished in 1809.

The church's remains were preserved by the intervention of Trinity House in 1810, since the towers had long been important as a landmark for shipping: preservation was achieved through the first effective effort to protect the cliff on which the church then stood from further erosion. Some materials from the structure were incorporated into a replacement church, also dedicated to St Mary, built at Hillborough in the same parish. Much of the rest was used for the building of a new harbour wall at Margate, known as Margate Pier. Other, surviving remnants include fragments of a high cross of stone that once stood inside the church, and two stone columns from a triple arch between the nave and chancel: the columns formed part of the original church and were still in place when demolition began. The cross fragments and columns are now kept in Canterbury Cathedral, and are among features that have led to the church being described as an exemplar of Anglo-Saxon church architecture and sculpture.

Origins

The first church known to have existed at Reculver was founded in 669, when King Ecgberht of Kent gave land there to Bassa the priest for this purpose. The author of the Anglo-Saxon Chronicle "clearly considered this to be a significant event", and it may be that King Ecgberht's intention in founding a church at Reculver was to create an ecclesiastical centre with a strong English element, to counterbalance domination of the Canterbury Church by Archbishop Theodore, from Tarsus, now in Turkey, Abbot Hadrian of St Augustine's, from North Africa, probably Cyrenaica, and their equally "non-native followers." Historians vary over whether to call the church a minster or a monastery – thus Susan Kelly uses the former term, but Nicholas Brooks uses the latter, commenting that:

The foundation of this church, sited within the remains of the Roman fort of Regulbium, exemplifies the "widespread practice [in Anglo-Saxon England] of re-using Roman walled places for major churches"; the new church was built "almost completely from demolished Roman structures". The arches were formed using Roman tiles, but the columns were made for the church rather than being Roman in origin, and their form has been attributed to late-Roman and early Byzantine architectural influences, probably transmitted via the contemporary architecture of Merovingian France. Around the inside of the apse was a stone bench, and two small rooms, or porticus, forming rudimentary transepts were built out from the north and south sides of the church where the nave met the chancel, from which they could be accessed. The presence of a stone bench around the inside of the apse has been attributed to influence from the Syrian Church, at a time when its followers were being displaced. The walls of the church were rendered inside and out, giving them a plain appearance and hiding the masonry.

The grant was made at Reculver, and the charter in which it was recorded was probably written by a Reculver scribe. The grant of Sarre in particular is significant:

In the original, 7th-century charter recording this grant, Reculver is referred to as a civitas, or city, but this is probably a reference to either its Roman past or the church's monastic status, rather than a large population centre. In 692 Reculver's abbot Berhtwald was elected Archbishop of Canterbury, from which position he probably offered Reculver patronage and support. Bede, writing no more than 40 years later, described Berhtwald as having been well educated in the Bible and experienced in ecclesiastical and monastic affairs, but in terms indicating that Berhtwald was not a scholar.

Further charters show that the monastery at Reculver continued to benefit from Kentish kings in the 8th century, under abbots Heahberht (fl. 748x762), Deneheah (fl. 760) and Hwitred (fl. 784), acquiring lands in Higham and Sheldwich and exemption from the toll due on one ship at Fordwich, and King Eadberht II of Kent was buried in the church in the 760s. Properties belonging to Reculver in the 7th and 8th centuries are indicated in passing by otherwise unrelated records, such as the estate at Higham, land probably in the High Weald area of Kent, from which iron may have been sourced for use or sale at or on behalf of Reculver, and an unidentified property named Dunwaling land in the district of Eastry. Such records also identify other abbots of Reculver, namely Æthelmær (fl. 699), Bære (fl. 761x764), Æthelheah (fl. 803), Dudeman (fl. 805), Beornwine (fl. 811x826), Baegmund (fl. 832x839), Daegmund (fl. 825x883) and Beornhelm (fl. 867x905).

By the early 9th century the monastery had become "extremely wealthy", but from then on it appears in records as "essentially a piece of property". For most of the period from 764 to 825 Kent was under the control of kings of Mercia, beginning with Offa (757–96), who treated Kent as part of his patrimony: he may also have claimed direct control of Reculver, as he did with similar churches in other areas. In 811 control of the monastery appears to have been in the hands of Archbishop Wulfred of Canterbury, who is recorded as having deprived it of some of its land. But by 817 Reculver was in the hands of King Coenwulf of Mercia (796–821), together with the nunnery at Minster-in-Thanet, through which he would also have had strategically lucrative control of the Wantsum Channel: Coenwulf had by then secured a privilege from Pope Leo III that gave him the right to "dispose of his ... monasteries in [England] at will". In that year a "monumental showdown" began between Archbishop Wulfred and King Coenwulf over the control of monasteries, featuring Reculver and Minster-in-Thanet in particular. The dispute over Reculver continued until 821, when Wulfred "made a humiliating submission to [Coenwulf]", surrendering to him an estate of 300 hides, possibly at Eynsham in Oxfordshire, and paying a fine of £120, to secure the return of Reculver and Minster-in-Thanet. The record of the dispute indicates that Wulfred continued to be denied control of Reculver and Minster-in-Thanet after 821 by Cwoenthryth, Coenwulf's heir and abbess of Minster-in-Thanet, until a final settlement was reached at a synod at Clofesho in 825.

From 825 control of Kent fell to the kings of Wessex, and a compromise was reached between Archbishop Ceolnoth and King Egbert in 838, confirmed by his son Æthelwulf in 839, recognising Egbert and Æthelwulf as lay lords and protectors of monasteries and reserving spiritual lordship, particularly over election of abbots and abbesses, to bishops. One copy of the record of this agreement was preserved either at Reculver or at Lyminge. A factor leading to this abandonment of Wulfred's strict policy may have been the increasing intensity of Viking attacks, which had begun in Kent in the late 8th century and had seen the ravaging of the Isle of Sheppey in 835. An army of Vikings spent the winter of 851 on the Isle of Thanet and the same occurred on the Isle of Sheppey in 855. Reculver, like most of the Kentish monasteries, lay in an exposed coastal location, and would have presented an obvious target for Vikings in search of treasure. By the 10th century the monastery at Reculver had ceased to be an important church in Kent and, together with its territory, it was in the hands of the kings of Wessex alone.

Monastery to parish church

Reculver may have remained home to a religious community into the 10th century, despite its vulnerability to Viking attacks. It is possible that the abbot and community of Reculver took refuge from the Vikings in Canterbury, as the abbess and community of Lyminge did in 804. A monk of Reculver named Ymar was recorded as a saint in the early 15th century by Thomas Elmham, who found the name in a martyrology, and wrote that Ymar was buried in St John's Church, Margate: Ymar was probably killed by Vikings in the 10th century, and hence regarded as a martyr. The Church in East Kent seems broadly to have "preserved its primary ... character against all the odds", but evidence for the monastery at Reculver is lacking: by the 11th century the monastery had "dropped out of sight entirely". The last abbot is recorded as Wenredus: although it is unknown when he was abbot, it must have been after 890 – possibly 905 – when the name of Abbot Beornhelm last appears in Anglo-Saxon charters. The church was last described as a monastery in about 1030, when it was governed by a dean named Givehard and was home to monks, two of whom are named as Fresnot and Tancrad: these names indicate the presence of a religious community from the European continent, probably Flemings. This may have been nothing more than a temporary "resurgence of communal life at Reculver, at least for a period in the earlier eleventh century. ... [Perhaps] the old minster ... was provided as a refuge for a body of foreign clerics".

By 1066 the monastery had become a parish church, with no baptismal function. In 1086, Reculver was listed in Domesday Book among lands belonging to the archbishop of Canterbury: in practice, however, it must previously have been lost to him again, since William the Conqueror is recorded as having returned it to the archbishop, along with other churches and properties, at his death, which occurred in 1087. The value of the manor of Reculver in 1066 is given as £14, but in 1086 it was worth a total of £42.7s. (£42.35): this can be compared with, for example, the £20 due to the archbishop from the manor of Maidstone, and £50 from the borough of Sandwich. Included in the Domesday account for Reculver, as well as the church, farmland, a mill, salt pans and a fishery, are 90 villeins and 25 bordars: these numbers can be multiplied four or five times to account for dependents, as they only represent "adult male heads of households".

By the 13th century Reculver parish provided an ecclesiastical benefice of "exceptional wealth", which led to disputes between lay and Church interests. In 1291 the Taxatio of Pope Nicholas IV put the total income due to the rector and vicar of Reculver at about £130. Included in the parish were chapels of ease at St Nicholas-at-Wade and All Saints' Church, Shuart, both on the Isle of Thanet, and at Hoath and Herne. The parish was broken up in 1310 by Robert Winchelsey, archbishop of Canterbury from 1294 to 1313, who created parishes from Reculver's chapelries at Herne and, on the Isle of Thanet, St Nicholas-at-Wade and Shuart, in response to the difficulties posed by the distance between them and their mother church at Reculver, and a "steady increase in population", which Winchelsey estimated at more than 3,000. At this time Shuart became part of St Nicholas-at-Wade parish, and its church was later demolished. However, St Mary's Church, Reculver, continued to receive payments from the parishes of Herne and St Nicholas-at-Wade in the 19th century as a "token of subjection to Reculver", as well as for the repair of St Mary's Church, and the parish retained a perpetual curacy at Hoath until 1960.

Enlargement and decline

Enlargement

The church building was considerably enlarged over time. The outer walls of the north and south porticus were extended westwards to enclose the nave in the 8th century, forming a series of rooms, including chapels on both northern and southern sides, and a porch across the western side. The towers were added as part of an extension with a new west front in the late 12th century, when the internal walls of the rooms added in the 8th century were demolished, creating aisles on the north and south sides of the nave. In the 13th century the original apse was demolished and the chancel more than doubled in size, incorporating a triple east window of lancets with columns of Purbeck Marble, and in the 15th century north and south porches were added to the nave. A chantry in the church was endowed in 1354 in memory of Alicia de Brouke, and two more were endowed in 1371 by Thomas Niewe, a former vicar of Reculver. These chantries were suppressed in the reign of Edward VI, in 1548 or very early in 1549. The towers were topped with spires by 1414, since they are shown in an illustrated map drawn by Thomas Elmham in or before that year, and the north tower held a ring of bells, accessed by a spiral staircase. The addition of the towers, "an extraordinary investment ... for a parish church", and the extent to which the church was enlarged in the Middle Ages, suggest that "a thriving township must have developed nearby." Despite all the building work, the church retained many prominent Anglo-Saxon features, and one in particular roused John Leland to "an enthusiasm which he seldom displayed" when he visited Reculver in 1540:

The high cross described by Leland had been removed from the church by 1784. Archaeologists examined what was believed to be the base of a 7th-century cross in 1878 and the 1920s, and it has been suggested that the monastery at Reculver was originally built around it. The Reculver cross has been compared with the Anglo-Saxon Ruthwell Cross – an open-air preaching cross in Dumfries and Galloway, Scotland – and traces of paint on fragments of the Reculver cross show that its details were once multicoloured. Later, stylistic assessments indicate that the cross, carved from a re-used Roman column, probably dates from the 8th century or the 9th, and that the stone believed to have been the base may have been the foundation for the original, 7th-century altar. Leland also reported a wall painting of an unidentified bishop, on the north side of the church under an arch. Another Anglo-Saxon item Leland found in the church was a gospel book: this was

Decline

When Leland visited Reculver in 1540, he noted that the coastline to the north had receded to within little more than a quarter of a mile (402 m) of the "Towne [which] at this tyme [was] but Village lyke". Soon after, in 1576, William Lambarde described Reculver as "poore and simple". In January 1658 the local justices of the peace were petitioned concerning "encroachments of the sea ... [that had] since Michaelmas last [29 September 1657] encroached on the land near six rods ], and will doubtless do more harm".

The decline of the settlement led to the decline of the church. In 1776 Thomas Philipot described it as "full of solitude, and languished into decay". In 1787 John Pridden noticed that the roofline of the nave must have been lowered at some time, judging by the tops of the east and west walls, and the fact that the tops of the two windows over the west door were at that time filled in with brick; he also noted that the roof had been repaired in 1775 by A. Sayer, churchwarden, these details appearing embossed on replacement lead. But he described the church as "a weather-beaten building ... mouldering away by the fury of the elements", and a letter to The Gentleman's Magazine in 1809 said that it was then somewhat dilapidated, with "trifling ... repairs such as have only tended to obliterate its once-harmonizing beauties."

Destruction
In the autumn of 1807 a northerly storm combined with a high tide to bring erosion of the cliff on which the church stood to within the churchyard, destroying "ten yards [9.1 m] of the wall around the churchyard, not ten yards from the foundation of the church". Sea defences had been in place since at least 1783, but although they had been costly to build their design had led to further undermining of the cliff. Two further schemes were devised by Sir Thomas Page and John Rennie to preserve the cliff by means of new sea defences, Rennie's being estimated to cost £8,277. Instead, at a vestry meeting on 12 January 1808, and at the instigation of the vicar, Christopher Naylor, it was decided that the church should be demolished. The decision was reached by vote among eight of the leading residents of Reculver and Hoath, including the vicar: the votes were evenly split, so the vicar used his casting vote in favour of demolition. Naylor applied to the Archbishop of Canterbury, Charles Manners-Sutton, for permission to demolish, arguing that "in all human probability the parishioners [would] shortly be deprived of a place for the interment of their dead." The archbishop commissioned neighbouring clergy and landowners to assess the situation, and they reported in March 1809 that the church should be demolished "to save the materials for the erection of another church."

Demolition was begun in September 1809 using gunpowder, in what has been described as "an act of vandalism for which there can be few parallels even in the blackest records of the nineteenth century":

The demolition of this "shrine of early Christendom", and exemplar of Anglo-Saxon church architecture and sculpture, was otherwise thorough, and it is now represented only by the ruins on the site, material incorporated into a replacement parish church at Hillborough, fragments of the cross, and the two stone columns that had been part of the church's triple arch. The columns and fragments of the cross are on display in Canterbury Cathedral. Two thousand tons of stone from the demolished church were sold and incorporated into the harbour wall at Margate, known as Margate Pier, which was completed in 1815, and more than 40 tons of lead was stripped from the church and sold for £900. In 1810 Trinity House bought what was left of the structure from the parish for £100, to ensure that the towers were preserved as a navigational aid, and built the first groynes, designed to protect the cliff on which the ruins stand. The spires had both been destroyed by storms by 1819, when Trinity House replaced them with similarly shaped, open structures, topped by wind vanes. These structures remained until they were removed some time after 1928. The ruins of the church, and the site of the Roman fort within which it was built, are now in the care of English Heritage, and the sea defences around Reculver are maintained by the Environment Agency.

Archaeology

The first archaeological report on the then demolished church of St Mary was published by George Dowker in 1878. The floor had previously been described in 1782, prior to the church's demolition, as polished smooth and finished in red, a sample having been taken with difficulty using a pickaxe. Within the floor Dowker also found what he believed was the foundation for the stone cross described by Leland, and noted that the concrete floor appeared to have been laid around it. The floor of the chancel appeared to have been raised by about  when the chancel was extended in the Early English period, and had been covered with encaustic tiles. Dowker also reported hearing from a Mr Holmans about the existence of a large, circular burial vault at the east end of the chancel, containing coffins arranged in a circle.

Further excavations were undertaken in the 1920s by C. R. Peers, who found that the nave of the original church had external doors on the north, south and west sides, and that the chancel had doors leading into the north and south porticus, which in turn had external doors on their eastern sides. Regarding the concrete floor described by Dowker, Peers noted that the surface consisted of a thin layer of pounded brick, and believed that it was of the same date as the stone that Dowker described as the foundation for the stone cross. Excavations also revealed steps leading down to the burial vault reported by Dowker, although Peers did not refer to either the steps or the vault in his report. Extensions of the porticus to the west and around the original west front were dated to no more than 100 years after the church was first built, and Peers observed that these extensions had been given the same type of floor as the original church. Drawing comparisons with the 7th-century chapel of St Peter-on-the-Wall at Bradwell-on-Sea, in Essex, and the abbey of St Augustine at Canterbury, Peers suggested that the original church at Reculver probably had windows set high in the northern and southern walls of the nave. Areas of wall found by archaeologists but now missing above ground are marked on the site by strips of concrete edged with flint.

The church was found to have been free-standing, so any other monastic buildings must have stood apart. In 1966, archaeologists discovered the foundations of what they identified as probably a medieval building, rectangular and on an east-west axis, with its eastern wall aligned with that of the church precinct, which it pre-dated. Extending over and in contact with the western end of a Roman bath house, it stood a few yards east of the south-eastern corner of the 13th-century chancel. This building was not recorded by William Boys, who drew a plan of the Roman fort and the church in 1781. Otherwise no such buildings have been found, but they may all have been in the area to the north of the church, which has been lost to the sea. In this connection Peers noted that the cloisters of the early Canterbury churches of St Augustine's and Christ Church were both on their northern sides, and that St Augustine's had also been free-standing in the 7th century. A building that stood west-northwest of the church may have had an Anglo-Saxon doorway and the dimensions of an Anglo-Saxon church, and had "the appearance of having been part of some monastic erection". It was demolished after the sea weakened its foundations during storms in the winter of 1782. Leland reported another building outside the churchyard, where it was believed that a parish church had stood while the main church at Reculver was still a monastery: this building, formerly a chapel dedicated to St James, was later known as the "chapel-house", and stood in the north-eastern corner of the fort until it collapsed into the sea on 13 October 1802. Peers noted further that it seems to have had brick arches.

St John's Cathedral, Parramatta

The design of the twin towers, spires and west front of St John's Cathedral, Parramatta, in Sydney, Australia, which were added in 1817–1819, is based on those of St Mary's Church at Reculver. Efforts to save St Mary's Church were under way when Governor Lachlan Macquarie and his wife Elizabeth left England for Australia in 1809. Elizabeth Macquarie asked John Watts, the governor's aide-de-camp from 1814 to 1819, to design the towers for St John's Cathedral, and these, together with its west front, are the oldest remaining parts of an Anglican church in Australia, and are on the oldest site of continuous Christian worship there. In 1990 a stone from St Mary's Church was presented to St John's Cathedral by the Historic Building and Monuments Commission for England, now English Heritage.

References

Footnotes

Notes

Bibliography

7th-century church buildings in England
Anglo-Saxon monastic houses
Archaeological sites in Kent
Church ruins in England
Monasteries in Kent
Buildings and structures demolished in 1809
Demolished churches in England
Churches completed in 669